The Brandywine Highway is a north–south limited-access highway in the vicinity of the city of Binghamton, New York, in the United States. The highway is maintained by the New York State Department of Transportation and extends for  through Downtown Binghamton and the neighboring village of Port Dickinson. The southern terminus of the highway is at New York State Route 434 (NY 434) in Binghamton and its northern terminus is at Interstate 88 (I-88) in Fenton just north of the Port Dickinson village line.

The Brandywine Highway is designated as New York State Route 363 from NY 434 to Brandywine Avenue and part of NY 7 from Brandywine Avenue to I-88.  NY 363 is also known as North Shore Drive.

Route description
The Brandywine Highway begins as NY 363 at an interchange with NY 434 in Downtown Binghamton near the confluence of the Susquehanna and Chenango Rivers. The route, a limited-access extension of North Shore Drive, heads northeast along the north bank of the Susquehanna River and around the downtown district. While on the riverbank, NY 363 southbound connects to Susquehanna Street by way of an interchange. Due to the presence of the Susquehanna River south of the freeway, the onramps from NY 434 north and Susquehanna Street (via Carroll Street) to NY 363 north are actually located north of NY 363 southbound for a short distance (thus running anti-parallel to traffic on NY 363 southbound) before passing under NY 363 south and merging with NY 363 northbound on the left-hand side of the road.

Past Susquehanna Street, NY 363 continues along the Susquehanna River to a parclo interchange with U.S. Route 11 (US 11, named Court Street) just east of NYSEG Stadium. Past US 11, the expressway leaves the riverbank and heads northward over the Norfolk Southern Railway's Southern Tier Line before merging with NY 7 (Brandywine Avenue) northbound. Here, NY 363 ends and the freeway becomes part of NY 7. Although most of the Brandywine Highway is limited-access, there is an at-grade intersection between NY 7 and Frederick Street just north of the Brandywine Avenue interchange. However, only right-hand turns are permitted from NY 7.

North of Frederick Street, the highway becomes limited-access once more and connects to the conjoined routes of I-81 and NY 17 by way of a cloverleaf interchange. Just north of the cloverleaf's northern tip is a simpler diamond interchange between NY 7 and Bevier Street. The highway continues on, paralleling a branch line off the Southern Tier Line northward through the city and into the village of Port Dickinson. A second at-grade intersection exists with Old State Road; however, unlike the first with Frederick Street, there are no turn restrictions at this intersection. NY 7 becomes limited-access once more, meeting a pair of service roads that serve Hillcrest before merging with I-88 just north of the Port Dickinson village limits in the town of Fenton. The Brandywine Highway ends here; however, NY 7 continues onto I-88.

History
The Brandywine Highway was constructed in the early 1960s and opened to traffic by 1968. The portion of the freeway north of Brandywine Avenue became a realignment of NY 7 while the remaining section from NY 434 to Brandywine Avenue was initially unnumbered. The NY 434–Brandywine Avenue segment was designated as NY 363 on July 1, 1974. In the late 1980s, the northernmost portion of the highway was reconfigured to accommodate the new I-88.

Exit list

References

External links

Binghamton, New York
Limited-access roads in New York (state)
Transportation in Broome County, New York